John Amirante (May 12, 1934 – April 17, 2018) was an American singer who was the anthem singer of the New York Rangers at Madison Square Garden from 1980 until his retirement in 2015. He also sang the anthem for the New York Yankees and New York Mets. He was born in The Bronx, New York.

Amirante died on April 17, 2018 at the age of 83.

References

1934 births
2018 deaths
American male singers
Entertainers from the Bronx
New York Rangers personnel
Singers from New York City